McKenna is an unincorporated community in Pierce County, Washington, United States, located on State Route 507 and the Nisqually River, east of Yelm.

Founded around 1908, McKenna is a former timber company town.

References

External links
Yelm History Project

Unincorporated communities in Pierce County, Washington
Unincorporated communities in Washington (state)
Company towns in Washington (state)